The Veterinary Surgeons Act 1966 is an act of the Parliament of the United Kingdom that makes legal provision for the definition of the qualifications to practise veterinary surgery in the realm.

References

United Kingdom Acts of Parliament 1966
Veterinary medicine in the United Kingdom